Rayman Raving Rabbids 2 is a party video game developed and published by Ubisoft. The sequel to Rayman Raving Rabbids and the second installment of the Raving Rabbids spin-off franchise, it was released for the Wii and Nintendo DS platforms worldwide in 2007. It follows the Rabbids' attempt to invade Earth, with their headquarters set up near a local shopping mall. Players have the option to play as a Rabbid or as Rayman, who has disguised himself as a Rabbid to infiltrate their plans. This is the first Rayman game to have an E10+ rating by the ESRB, a greater emphasis on simultaneous multiplayer gameplay compared to the original game, and online leaderboards. It was followed by Rayman Raving Rabbids: TV Party in 2008.

Gameplay
Minigames in Rayman Raving Rabbids 2 are played by entering a mode known as 'Trips', which is divided into five regions of the Earth: USA, Europe, Asia, South America, and Tropics. The game features 54 minigames with 9 divided upon each region, 5 of which are randomly chosen each time the player begins a trip. Completing a trip unlocks those minigames, which can later be played individually through Free Play mode. Additionally, players can use a Trip Customization mode to create their own trips using the available minigames.

Rayman Raving Rabbids 2 features a wide variety of minigames that focus on different themes and use different control schemes. In rhythm music games, players use selective instruments (singing, guitar, drum, keyboard, etc.) to perform as part of a Rabbid band. Each minigame can be played with up to four players at once, as either Rabbids or Rayman.

Shooting games, which in the first Rayman Raving Rabbids were scattered among the regular levels, have now been moved to a separate area called the Shooting Arcade, where they can be played after completion of Trips. These first-person rail shooter games utilize real footage of locations around the world with Rabbids digitally inserted. As with other games in the Raving Rabbids series, plungers serve a primary role as ammunition.

Character customization
Raving Rabbids 2 features an ability to create both custom Rayman outfits as well as custom Rabbids. These outfits are often parodies or references to famous movie, comic book or video game characters, including Indiana Jones, Spider-Man, Superman, Teenage Mutant Ninja Turtles, Sam Fisher, Ken Masters from Street Fighter, a Mantel Trooper from the PlayStation 3 game Haze, a Krusty Krew hat from the TV series SpongeBob SquarePants, Jason Voorhees from Friday the 13th, and the Altair costume from another Ubisoft game, Assassin's Creed, that is often referred by fans as "The Bunny Creed".

Plot

Characters
Rayman and the Rabbids return in this game.  Players take the role of Rayman in Trips mode, and have the option of playing as either Rayman or a Rabbid in Free Play mode. It is possible to unlock costumes for both Rayman and Rabbids by completing high scores in both minigames and shooting games, or by shooting a specific Rabbid in each shooting game. Occasionally, when the player beats a high score, a new Rabbid will join their party as a play-and-customizable character.

Story
The game starts with a breaking news over the Rabbids invading the Earth. They run amok and attack a reporter broadcasting amidst the chaos. This appears to be coming from Rayman's TV, as he sets off to put a stop to the Rabbids' plans. Later, Rayman is seen infiltrating a mall overrun by Rabbids. As he's about to sneak in, he disguises himself wearing two socks on his head, a headband with two makeshift eyes, and inhaling helium into his lungs (in order to disguise his voice, thus blending in more with the other Rabbids). He then picks up a soda can and throws it to distract two guard Rabbids and steals one of their plungers. Rayman climbs to the roof of the facility and peers through a skylight, where he observes the Rabbids watching a montage of everyday human life to study them. Seconds later, one of the Rabbids jerks its head, noticing Rayman's presence. Accidentally, he falls into the mall and is spotted. A Rabbid with split color eyes (also known as Professor Barranco 3) walks up to him and whips out a European Wii copy of the first Raving Rabbids game. Taking a look at the cover, it seems to recognize Rayman. Thinking quickly, Rayman screams "BWAAAAAAAAH!", convincing the Rabbids that he is one of their own. Rayman and the Rabbids are then led into an airborne submarine, taking him to a location for invasion.

Nintendo DS story
The Nintendo DS version of the game features a similar storyline with a few differences. The Wii version shows how Rayman invades the Rabbids HQ in disguise, while the DS storyline explains how Rayman followed the Rabbids to Earth and learns on how the Rabbids plan to act like humans. He then decides to help the humans by following the Rabbids on each area of the world (i.e. USA, Europe, Asia, etc.) by collecting information and evidence on the Rabbids antics and behavior. While remarking that the Rabbids are too stupid to understand the world and its culture, he still knows that they are a dangerous threat. He then gives the info to the humans to help prevent any more Rabbid attacks in the future at the end of story mode, which happened again.

Development

Previews and marketing
The original teaser trailer is a parody of the trailer for the 2007's Transformers film. As with other games in the Raving Rabbids series, Ubisoft released a number of humorous promotional videos entitled "Around the World", featuring Rabbids in a number of locations such as Japan; France; and Leipzig, Germany. Featuring the music of Around the World by Daft Punk.

Reception

Rayman Raving Rabbids 2 received mixed to positive reviews as well as slightly less praise in comparison to its predecessor, with a 68% GameRankings average (Rayman Raving Rabbids had a 76% GameRankings average). IGN dismissed the game as disappointing, as they felt the core games were less enjoyable than those in the first. GameSpot stated that despite not being nearly as captivating as the first game, it also has its quality moments.

References

External links
 Rayman Raving Rabbids 2 Confirmed

2007 video games
Party video games
Rayman
Rabbids
Nintendo DS games
Ubisoft games
Wii Wi-Fi games
Windows games
Nintendo Wi-Fi Connection games
Jade (game engine) games
Video games about rabbits and hares
Video games developed in France
Video games scored by Mark Griskey
Multiplayer and single-player video games